Eddermys Sanchez (born in Sancti Spíritus, Cuba) is a Belizean judoka. At the 2012 Summer Olympics he competed in the Men's 66 kg, but was defeated in the second round.

References

External links
 Eddermys Sanchez at Sports Reference

Year of birth missing (living people)
Living people
Belizean male judoka
Olympic judoka of Belize
Judoka at the 2012 Summer Olympics